Nigel Ayers (born 1957 in Tideswell, Derbyshire) is an English multimedia artist. His sound art has included numerous audio releases and live performances through his group Nocturnal Emissions.

His sound art collaborations includes work with Bourbonese Qualk, C.C.C.C., Andrew Liles, Lustmord, Randy Greif, Robin Storey, Expose Your Eyes, Stewart Home, Z'EV, and Zoviet France.

In 1980, he founded the record label Sterile Records, releasing the first records by John Balance, Maurizio Bianchi and Lustmord, among many others. In 1987 he formed the Earthly Delights (record label).

In the early 1990s, he performed live soundtracks for the Butoh performances of Poppo & the Go Go Boys. His visual art has been exhibited in the Tate, ICA, and worn by the soccer legend Diego Maradona.

Sound art

Ayers' sound art work is rooted in assemblage and collage. Years before digital sampling became commonplace, his recordings used thousands of edited "found" and specially recorded sound samples. His interest in the psychological effects of sound, and in particular the recombination of sound to affect perception of time and space is reflected in CD titles such as "Practical Time Travel" where sound functions as snapshots of memory forming new associations as it passes into a simulated dream world.

He is also interested in eroding the concept of individualised artistic personality using digital technologies to enable multiple authorship. This is exemplified in the remixable sound sample libraries he has released as a sound developer in the commercially released sample libraries for Sony's ACID Pro and Propellerhead's Reason (software).

In his sound installations, such as Soul Zodiac (2006) and The Planetarium Must Be Built (2007) he has explored the possibilities of digital remixes in both time and space, using everyday equipment such as multiple CD boomboxes.

Bibliography
Mind Invaders: A Reader in Psychic Warfare, Cultural Sabotage And Semiotic Terrorism Stewart Home Ed. (Serpent's Tail London, 1997). 
International Who's Who in Popular Music (Routledge, 2007). 
Bodmin Moor Zodiac (2007).
The Control You Gain. The Power You Rule. (2009).
NETWORK NEWS (Nocturnal Emissions, 2009).
Lusitania (Earthly Delights, 2010).
 S. Alexander Reed Assimilate: A Critical History of Industrial Music (Oxford University Press USA, 2013).   
Electronic Resistance (Amaya Productions, 2021).

References

Sample libraries 
Myths of Technology
Organic Chemistry
Loop Noir – Paranormal Sound Design

External links
Personal website
Earthly Delights record label
Video of The Planetarium Must be Built
artcornwall.org Interview

English artists
Living people
1957 births
English experimental musicians
English industrial musicians
People from Tideswell
Soleilmoon artists